Qareh Guni or Qara Gunei or Qareh Gowney() may refer to:
 Qareh Guni, Heris
 Qareh Guni, Khoda Afarin

See also
 Qarah Gonay (disambiguation)